Cooking Lake may refer to:

Cooking Lake (Alberta), a lake in Canada
Cooking Lake, Alberta, a hamlet in Canada

See also
North Cooking Lake